Dhok Nawan Lok is a village in the Punjab area of Pakistan.  It lies 18 kilometers east of Mandi Bahauddin and 0.5 kilometers north of Dhok Kasib.

Demographics
Dhok Nawan Lok has a population of around 5,000 with a literacy rate of 80%. The main caste in Dhok Nawan Lok are Sahi.  The most common industries are agricultural and services related.  After 1995, most of the younger people of this town preferred to travel abroad as economic migrants, resulting in approximately 15% of the natives under 35 years of age now residing in Europe and North America.

Economy
The migration of a large portion of the population changed the entire local economy; foreign capital now accounts for around 90 percent of the total income of the town. This has resulted in higher prices for real estate and agricultural property. Per acre non-agricultural properties in real estate have also risen to an estimated 3200,000 PK Rs (4,000 m²).

References 

Union councils of Mandi Bahauddin District
Villages in Mandi Bahauddin District